Morgannwg was a medieval Welsh kingdom formed via the merger of the kingdoms of the Kingdom of Glywysing and the Kingdom of Gwent.

Formation of Morgannwg 
First under King Morgan the Generous (fl. ) until the end of the reign of his descendant Ithel (d. c. 745), and later again under King Morgan the Old (r. 942-74), the kingdom merged with Gwent and changed its name to Morgannwg or Gwlad Morgan in honour of the Morgan Kings. During such unions Glywysing and Gwent seem to have been together or occasional sub-kingdoms or principalities of the Kingdom of Morgannwg.

After the death of Morgan the Old, Gwent and Glywysing were separated again from 974 to 1055, but Glywysing alone was often referred to as Morgannwg. Both areas were conquered by Gruffydd ap Llywelyn in about 1055, subsequently King of Wales, but on Gruffydd's death in 1063, Glywysing was regained by the native lineage under Caradog ap Gruffudd. Morgannwg, the union between Gwent and Glywysing, was reconstituted. How this occurred is unclear; possibly the Kings of Glywysing were also Kings of Morgannwg and the Kings of Gwent were semi-independent under-Kings, or vice versa.

Norman conquest 

With Gwent increasingly overrun by the Norman conquest of Wales, the last native King of Morgannwyg and Glywysing was Iestyn ap Gwrgan (1081–1090), who was subsequently deposed by Robert Fitzhamon. Iestyn's sons became Lords of Afan, while Owain ap Caradog ap Gruffudd contented himself with Gwynllwg and founded the line of the Lords of Caerleon.

The name Morgannwg is still used in Wales for the former Marcher Lordship and county of Glamorgan (itself a corruption of the term Gwlad Morgan) and its successor counties

List of rulers 

The kingdom of Morgannwg was formed by the union of the kingdoms of Morgannwg and  Gwent. Over time, in a few instances, the kingdoms were separate and independent.

Glywysing 

 Eugenius, son of Magnus Maximus

 Marius, son of Eugenius

 Solar, son of Marius

 Glywys, son of Solar (c. 470–c. 480), who gave his name to the kingdom

 Gwynllyw, son of Glywys, ruler of Gwynllwg (c. 480–523), cantref of Glywysing

 Pawl, son of Glywys, ruler of Penychen (c. 480–540), cantref of Glywysing

 Mechwyn, son of Glywys, ruler of Gorfynydd (c. 480–c.500), cantref  of Glywysing

 Cadoc, son of Gwynllyw, ruler of Gwynllwg (523–580) and Penychen (540–580), died without heirs

Glywysing is ruled by the Kings of Gwent until Rhys ap Ithel

 Rhys ap Ithel/Rhys ab Idwal, son of the Kings of Gwent (c. 755–785), with brothers, Rhodri and Meurig

 Arthfael Hen ap Rhys (Arthfael the Old) (785–c. 825) with Brochfael ap Rhys

 Rhys ap Arthfael, (c. 830–c. 840)

 Hywel ap Rhys, (c. 840–886)

 Owain ap Hywel (886–)

 Gruffydd ab Owain (–934) King of Gower

 Cadwgan ab Owain (–950) King of West Glywysing

 Morgan the Old (Morgan Hen or Morgan ab Owain or Moragn Hen Fawr) (930–974) united the former kingdoms of Gwent and Glywysing in 942 under the name of Morgannwg, but they were broken up again immediately after his death, remaining separate until about 1055

 Morgan the Old's son, Owain ap Morgan (974–c. 983)

 brothers of Owain ap Morgan (Idwallon, Hywel and Cadell) (dates unknown)

 his son, Rhys ab Owain (c. 990–c. 1000) who ruled Glywysing jointly with his brothers

 Ithel the Black, son Idwallon (990)

 Hywel ab Owain (c. 990–c. 1043) and

 Iestyn ab Owain (c. 990–c. 1015)

 his son, Rhydderch ap Iestyn (c. 1015–1033)

 his son, Gruffydd ap Rhydderch (1033–1055)

 Gwrgant ab Ithel the Black (1033 - 1070)

 Gruffydd ap Llywelyn, invader and prince of Gwynedd (1055–1063)

 Gruffydd ap Rhydderch's son, Caradog ap Gruffydd (1063–1081) who was a subject of the King of Gwent and King of Morgannwg Cadwgan ap Meurig before he deposed him and took the kingdom for himself

 Iestyn ap Gwrgan(t) (1081–1091)

Iestyn was the last ruler of an independent Morgannwg, which was thereafter in the possession of the Normans and became the lordship of Glamorgan

Gwent 

 Anwn Ddu (the same person as ruled Dyfed at this time). Welsh legend claims he was appointed by Magnus Maximus, who later became Roman Emperor (and hence referred to in Welsh as Macsen Wledig - Maximus the Emperor). Some genealogies claim him to be Magnus' son. His realm was divided upon his death between his sons Edynfed and Tudwal.

 in Caer-Went

 Edynfed ap Anwn - also ruler of Dyfed

  ap Ednyfed, and his wife - St Madrun ferch Gwerthefyr (Welsh rendering of Honorius)

 Iddon ap Ynyr (480 - 490)

 Caradog (Strongarm)

 Meurig ap Caradog and his wife - Dyfwn ferch Glywys

 Erbic ap Meurig ?

 in Caer-Leon

 Tudwal ap Anwn

 Teithrin ap Tudwal

 Teithfallt ap Teithrin (Welsh rendering of Theudebald)

 Tewdrig, son of  Teithfallt (490 – 493/517) (Welsh rendering of Theodoric). Traditionally, Tewdrig had a daughter - Marchell verch Tewdrig - for whom he carved out Brycheiniog as a dowry.

 Meurig ap Tewdrig King of Gwent (493/517 – 530–540)

 Athrwys ap Meurig King of Gwent (530–540 - 573)

 Frioc ap Meurig, with Idnerth ap Meurig ?

 Ithel ap Athrwys

 Morgan the Great ?

 Morgan the Courteous and Benefactor ? (-654)

 Anthres ap Morcant ? (654-663)

 Morgan the Generous (-730)

 Ithel ap Morgan (710/715 - 735/740/745/755)

 Ffernfael ab Idwal (-774/777)

 Athrwys ap Ffernfael (774-810)

 Idwallon ap Gwrgant (810-842)

 Ithel ap Hywel or ap Athrwys ?(842-848)

 Meurig ap Hywel or ap Ithel ? (848-849)

 Meurig ap Arthfael Hen (849-874)

 Ffernfael ap Meurig (874-880)

 Brochfael ap Meurig (880-920)

 Arthfael ap Hywel (-916/927)

 Owain ap Hywel (920-930)

 Cadell ap Arthfael (930-940/943)

 Morgan the Old, Morgan Hen or Morgan ab Owain or Morgan Hen Fawr (940/943–955) united the former kingdoms of Gwent and Glywysing in 942 under the name of Morgannwg but they were broken up again immediately after his death and remained separate until about 1055

 Nowy ap Gwriad ap Brochfael ap Rhodri ap Arthfael Hen ruled Gwent (c. 950–c. 970) while Glywysing was ruled jointly by brothers of Owain ap Morgan (dates unknown), probably under Morgan the Old

 his son, Arthfael ap Nowy (about 970–983)

 his cousin, Rhodri ap Elisedd (983–c. 1015) who ruled jointly with his brother,

 Gruffydd ap Elisedd (983–c. 1015)

 his cousin (?) Edwyn ap Gwriad (1015–1045)

 Hywel ab Owain's son, Meurig ap Hywel (1045–1055) who ruled jointly with

 his son, Cadwgan ap Meurig (1045–1055)

 Gruffydd ap Llywelyn, invader and prince of Gwynedd (1055–1063)

 Cadwgan ap Meurig (1063–1074) who was also King of Morgannwg, ruling Glywysing through

 Gruffydd ap Rhydderch's son, Caradog ap Gruffydd (1075–1081) who seized Gwent and the Kingdom of Morgannwg

 Iestyn ap Gwrgan(t) (1081–1091)

Iestyn was the last ruler of an independent Morgannwg, which was thereafter in the possession of the Normans and became the lordship of Glamorgan

 Owain ap Caradog (1081-1113/1116)

References 

History of Glamorgan
History of Monmouthshire